Giovanni Leonardo di Bona or Giovanni Leonardo da Cutri (both given names can be seen also in the reversed order Leonardo Giovanni), known as Il Puttino (1542–1597), was an early Italian chess master. 

Giovanni Leonardo was born in Cutro, Calabria. He studied law in Rome. In 1560, he lost a match to Ruy López in Rome. In 1566–1572, he travelled and played chess in Rome, Genoa, Marseille, Barcelona. He had played many times against Paolo Boi in Italy, and they were regarded as being equal in strength.

Giovanni Leonardo di Bona won the first known international master tournament in the history of chess in Madrid in 1575, therefore becoming the strongest chess master of the time. After their success at the Court of Spain, Leonardo and Paolo Boi, both travelled, albeit separately, to Lisbon, where they tested their chess skill against Il Moro, the eminent chess champion of King Don Sebastian, of Portugal. Again, they both succeeded—first Leonardo, soon followed by Paolo Boi—in defeating Il Moro.

After he won with Ruy Lopez in Spain, he asked for his town Cutro to be exonerated of taxes and called Cutro "City of Chess", where every year this event is remembered in a traditional day in August.
  
And again the King was generous with his rewards. After this triumph, Giovanni Leonardo di Bona, having been called the wandering knight (Il Cavaliere errante) by King Don Sebastian, left Portugal to return to Italy and settle in Naples where he became the chess master for the Prince of Bisignano.

External links

Biography 

1542 births
1597 deaths
People from the Province of Crotone
Italian chess players
16th-century chess players